MSCP may be an abbreviation for:
 Mass Storage Control Protocol, a software protocol developed by Digital Equipment Corporation
 Math and Science College Preparatory, a secondary school in Los Angeles, California, USA
 Mean Spherical Candle Power, a unit of measure that represents the average output of a light source measured in all directions (360°)
 Melbourne School of Continental Philosophy, an independent school based at the University of Melbourne, Australia
 Multi-storey car park, a chiefly British abbreviation for an automobile parking structure
 Manipur State Congress Party, is former political party in the Indian state of Manipur.